Animal Attraction is the second album from Finnish glam metal band Reckless Love.
It was released on 7 November 2011 through Spinefarm Records and debuted at number 10 on the national Finnish Charts.

Track list

Singles

Personnel 
 Olli Herman - lead vocals
 Pepe Salohalme - guitar
 Hessu Maxx - drums
 Jalle Verne - bass

References

2011 albums
Reckless Love albums
Spinefarm Records albums